The Last Word is a 2020 German television series starring Anke Engelke.

Cast 
 Anke Engelke as Karla Fazius
 Thorsten Merten as Andreas Borowski
 Johannes Zeiler as Stefan Fazius
 Nina Gummich as Judith Fazius
 Juri Winkler as Tonio Fazius
 Gudrun Ritter as Mina Dahlbeck
 Claudia Geisler-Bading as Frauke Borowski
 Aaron Hilmer as Ronnie Borowski
 Dela Dabulamanzi as Dr. Owusu

Episodes

Release
The Last Word was released on September 17, 2020 on Netflix.

Awards and nominations
The Last Word won the German Television Award for Best Comedy Series in 2021 and received a nomination for a Grimme Award in the same year.

References

External links
 
 

2020s German drama television series
German-language Netflix original programming
2020 German television series debuts